Sar Gandab-e Sofla (also Romanized as Sar Gandāb-e Soflá; also known as Sar Gandāb) is a village in Zirtang Rural District, Kunani District, Kuhdasht County, Lorestan Province, Iran. At the 2006 census, its population was 115, in 20 families.

References 

Towns and villages in Kuhdasht County